Aaliyah Dana Haughton (January 16, 1979 – August 25, 2001) was an American singer and actress. She has been credited for helping to redefine contemporary R&B, pop and hip hop, earning her the nicknames the "Princess of R&B" and "Queen of Urban Pop".

Born in Brooklyn but raised in Detroit, she first gained recognition at the age of 10, when she appeared on the television show Star Search and performed in concert alongside Gladys Knight. At the age of 12, Aaliyah signed with Jive Records and her uncle Barry Hankerson's Blackground Records. Hankerson introduced her to R. Kelly, who became her mentor, as well as lead songwriter and producer of her debut album, Age Ain't Nothing but a Number. The album sold three million copies in the United States and was certified double platinum by the Recording Industry Association of America (RIAA). After allegations of an illegal marriage with Kelly, Aaliyah ended her contract with Jive and signed with Atlantic Records.

Aaliyah worked with record producers Timbaland and Missy Elliott for her second album, One in a Million, which sold three million copies in the United States and more than eight million copies worldwide. In 2000, Aaliyah appeared in her first film, Romeo Must Die. She contributed to the film's soundtrack, which spawned the single "Try Again". The song topped the Billboard Hot 100 solely on airplay, making Aaliyah the first artist in Billboard history to achieve this goal. After completing Romeo Must Die, Aaliyah filmed her role in Queen of the Damned, and released, in 2001, her third and final album Aaliyah, which topped the Billboard 200.

On August 25, 2001, Aaliyah died at the age of 22 in an airplane accident in the Bahamas, when the overloaded aircraft she was traveling in crashed shortly after takeoff, killing all nine on board. The pilot was later found to have traces of cocaine and alcohol in his body and was not qualified to fly the aircraft designated for the flight. Aaliyah's family later filed a wrongful death lawsuit against the aircraft's operator, Blackhawk International Airways, which was settled out of court. In the decades since her death, Aaliyah's music has continued to achieve commercial success, aided by several posthumous releases. She has sold 8.1 million albums in the US and an estimated 24 to 32 million albums worldwide. Billboard lists her as the tenth most successful female R&B artist of the past 25 years, and the 27th most successful in history. Her accolades include three American Music Awards and two MTV VMAs, along with five Grammy Award nominations.

Early life
Aaliyah Dana Haughton was born on January 16, 1979, in Brooklyn, New York, the younger child of Diane and Michael "Miguel" Haughton, a warehouse worker. She was of African-American descent. Her name is the feminine form of the Arabic "Ali", meaning "highest, most exalted one, the best." Aaliyah was fond of her name, calling it "beautiful" and saying she was "very proud of it" and strove to live up to her name every day. Aaliyah's mother enrolled her in voice lessons at an early age. She started performing at weddings, church choir, and charity events. When Aaliyah was five years old, her family moved to Detroit, Michigan, where she was raised along with her older brother, Rashad. She attended a Catholic school, Gesu Elementary, where in first grade she was cast in the stage play Annie, which inspired her to become an entertainer. In Detroit, her father began working in the warehouse business, one of his brother-in-law Barry Hankerson's widening interests. Her mother stayed home and raised Aaliyah and her brother.

Aaliyah's mother was a vocalist, and her uncle Hankerson was an entertainment lawyer who had been married to Gladys Knight. As a child, Aaliyah traveled with Knight and worked with an agent in New York to audition for commercials and television programs, including Family Matters; she appeared on Star Search at age ten. Aaliyah chose to begin auditioning. Her mother made the decision to drop her surname. She auditioned for several record labels and at age 11 appeared in concerts alongside Knight. She had several pet animals during her childhood, including ducks, snakes and iguanas. Her cousin Jomo had a pet alligator, which Aaliyah felt was too much, remarking, "that was something I wasn't going to stroke."

Education
When she was growing up, Aaliyah attended Detroit schools and believed she was well-liked, but got teased for her short stature. She recalled coming into her own before age 15 and came to love her height. Her mother told her to be happy she was small and complimented her. Other children disliked Aaliyah, but she did not stay focused on them. "You always have to deal with people who are jealous, but there were so few it didn't even matter. The majority of kids supported me, which was wonderful. When it comes to dealing with negative people, I just let it in one ear and out the other. Those people were invisible to me." Even in her adult life, she considered herself small. She had "learned to accept and love" herself and added: "the most important thing is to think highly of yourself because if you don't, no one else will".

During her audition for acceptance to the Detroit High School for the Fine and Performing Arts, Aaliyah sang the song "Ave Maria" in its entirety in the Italian language. Aaliyah, who maintained a perfect 4.0 grade-point average when graduating from high school, felt education was important. She saw fit to keep her grades up despite the pressures and time constraints brought on her during the early parts of her career. She called herself a perfectionist and recalled always being a good student. Aaliyah reflected: "I always wanted to maintain that, even in high school when I first started to travel. I wanted to keep that 4.0. Being in the industry, you know, I don't want kids to think, 'I can just sing and forget about school.' I think it's very important to have an education, and even more important to have something to fall back on." She did this in her own life, as she planned to "fall back on" another part of the entertainment industry. She believed that she could teach music history or open her own school to teach that or drama if she did not make a living as a recording artist because, as she reasoned, "when you pick a career it has to be something you love".

Career

1991–1995: Age Ain't Nothing but a Number
After Hankerson signed a distribution deal with Jive Records, he signed Aaliyah to his Blackground Records label at the age of 12. Hankerson later introduced her to recording artist and producer R. Kelly, who became Aaliyah's mentor, as well as lead songwriter and producer of her first album, recorded when she was 14. Aaliyah's debut album, Age Ain't Nothing but a Number, was released under her mononym "Aaliyah", by Jive and Blackground Records on May 24, 1994; it debuted at number 24 on the Billboard 200 chart, selling 38,000 copies in its first week. It peaked at number 18 on the Billboard 200 and it was certified two times Platinum by the RIAA. To date the album has sold over 3 million copies in the US. In Canada, the album was certified gold by Music Canada for 50,000 copies in shipments. In 2014, Vibe magazine estimated that the album had sold six million copies globally.

Upon its release, Age Ain't Nothing But a Number received generally favorable reviews from music critics. Some writers noted that Aaliyah's "silky vocals" and "sultry voice" blended with Kelly's new jack swing helped define R&B in the 1990s. Her sound was also compared to that of female quartet En Vogue. Christopher John Farley of Time magazine called the album a "beautifully restrained work", noting that Aaliyah's "girlish, breathy vocals rode calmly on R. Kelly's rough beats". Stephen Thomas Erlewine of AllMusic felt that the album had its "share of filler", but described the singles as "slyly seductive". He also wrote that the songs on the album were "frequently better" than that of Kelly's second studio album, 12 Play. The single "At Your Best (You Are Love)" was criticized by Billboard for being out of place on the album and for its length.

Aaliyah's debut single, "Back & Forth", peaked at number 5 on the Hot 100 and topped the Hot R&B/Hip-Hop Songs chart for three weeks. Two more singles charted: a cover of the Isley Brothers' "At Your Best (You Are Love)" peaked at number 6 on the Billboard Hot 100, and the album's title track, "Age Ain't Nothing but a Number", peaked at number 75. Additionally, she released "The Thing I Like" as part of the soundtrack to the 1994 film A Low Down Dirty Shame.

1996–2000: One in a Million and Romeo Must Die

In 1996, Aaliyah left Jive Records and signed with Atlantic Records. She worked with record producers Timbaland and Missy Elliott, who contributed to her second studio album, One in a Million. Elliott recalled Timbaland and herself being nervous to work with Aaliyah, since Aaliyah had already released her successful debut album while Elliott and Timbaland were just starting out. Elliott also feared she would be a diva, but reflected that Aaliyah "came in and was so warming; she made us immediately feel like family." The album yielded the lead single "If Your Girl Only Knew", which peaked at number 11 on the Billboard Hot 100 and topped the Billboard Hot R&B/Hip-Hop Songs for two weeks. It also generated the singles "Hot Like Fire" and "4 Page Letter". One in a Million peaked at number 18 on the Billboard 200, and was certified double platinum by the RIAA on June 16, 1997, denoting shipments of two million copies. The album went on to sell 3 million copies in the US and over eight million copies worldwide. The year after her album was released, Aaliyah was featured on Timbaland & Magoo's debut single, "Up Jumps da Boogie".

In 1997 Aaliyah graduated with a 4.0 GPA from the Detroit High School for the Fine and Performing Arts, where she majored in drama. The same year, she began her acting career, playing herself in the police drama television series New York Undercover. During this time, Aaliyah participated in the Children's Benefit Concert, a charity concert at the Beacon Theatre in New York. She also became the spokesperson for the Tommy Hilfiger Corporation. During her campaign with Tommy Hilfiger, the company sold over 2,400 pairs of the red, white and blue baggy jeans she wore in their advertisements. In December 1997, she performed the Christmas carol "What Child Is This?" at the annual Christmas in Washington television special. She also contributed to the soundtrack album for the animated film Anastasia, performing a cover version of "Journey to the Past" that earned songwriters Lynn Ahrens and Stephen Flaherty a nomination for the Academy Award for Best Original Song. Aaliyah performed the song at the 1998 Academy Awards ceremony, becoming the youngest singer to perform at the event. Also in 1998, she released the song "Are You That Somebody?" which was featured on the Dr. Dolittle soundtrack. The song peaked at number 21 on the Billboard Hot 100 and earned Aaliyah her first Grammy Award nomination.

In 1999, Aaliyah landed her first big-screen acting role in Romeo Must Die. She starred opposite martial artist Jet Li, playing a couple who fall in love amid their warring families. Released on March 24, 2000, the movie grossed US$18.6 million in its first weekend, ranking number two at the box office. Aaliyah purposely stayed away from reviews of the film to "make it easier on" herself, but she heard "that people were able to get into me, which is what I wanted." In contrast, some critics felt there was no chemistry between her and Jet Li, as well as viewing the film as too simplistic. This was echoed by Elvis Mitchell of The New York Times, who wrote that while Aaliyah was "a natural" and the film was conceived as a spotlight for both her and Li, "they have so little chemistry together you'd think they're putting out a fire instead of shooting off sparks.

In addition to acting, Aaliyah served as an executive producer of the film's soundtrack, for which she contributed four songs. "Try Again" was released as a single from the soundtrack; the song topped the Billboard Hot 100, making Aaliyah the first artist to top the chart based solely on airplay; this led the song to be released in a 12-inch vinyl and 7-inch single. The music video won the Best Female Video and Best Video from a Film awards at the 2000 MTV Video Music Awards. It also earned her a Grammy Award nomination for Best Female R&B Vocalist. The soundtrack went on to sell 1.5 million copies in the United States.

2001: Aaliyah and Queen of the Damned

After completing Romeo Must Die, Aaliyah began to work on her second film, Queen of the Damned. She played the role of an ancient vampire, Queen Akasha, which she described as a "manipulative, crazy, sexual being". Filming both Romeo Must Die and Queen of the Damned delayed the release of the album. Aaliyah had not intended for her albums to have such a gap between them. "I wanted to take a break after One in a Million to just relax, think about how I wanted to approach the next album. Then, when I was ready to start back up, "Romeo" happened, and so I had to take another break and do that film and then do the soundtrack, then promote it. The break turned into a longer break than I anticipated." Aaliyah enjoyed balancing her singing and acting careers. Though she called music a "first" for her, she also had been acting since she was young and had wanted to begin acting "at some point in my career", but "wanted it to be the right time and the right vehicle" and felt Romeo Must Die "was it". Connie Johnson of the Los Angeles Times argued that Aaliyah having to focus on her film career may have caused her to not give the album "the attention it merited."

During the recording stages for the album, Aaliyah's publicist disclosed that the album's release date was most likely in October 2000. Ultimately she finished recording the album in March 2001; after a year of recording tracks that began in March of the previous year.
Eventually, Aaliyah was released five years after One in a Million on July 17, 2001, and it debuted at number two on the Billboard 200, selling 187,000 copies in its first week. The first single from the album, "We Need a Resolution", peaked at number 59 on the Billboard Hot 100. The week after Aaliyah's death, her third album rose from number 19 to number 1 on the Billboard 200. "Rock the Boat" was released as a posthumous single. The music video premiered on BET's Access Granted, and it became the most viewed and highest rated episode in the history of the show. The song peaked at number 14 on the Billboard Hot 100. Promotional posters for Aaliyah that had been put up in major cities such as New York and Los Angeles became makeshift memorials for grieving fans. In February 2002, the album was certified double Platinum by the RIAA.

"More than a Woman" and "I Care 4 U" were released as posthumous singles and peaked within the top 25 of the Billboard Hot 100. "More than a Woman" reached number one on the UK singles chart making Aaliyah the first female deceased artist to reach number one on the UK singles chart. "More than a Woman" was replaced by George Harrison's "My Sweet Lord" which is the only time in the UK singles chart's history when a dead artist has replaced another dead artist at number one.

Aaliyah was signed to appear in several future films, including a romantic film titled Some Kind of Blue, and a Whitney Houston–produced remake of the 1976 film Sparkle. Houston recalled Aaliyah being "so enthusiastic" about the film; the project was shelved after she died. Before her death Aaliyah filmed some scenes for the sequels of The Matrix as the character Zee. A portion of her role in The Matrix Reloaded was filmed; these unused scenes were included in the tribute section of the Matrix Ultimate Collection series.

Artistry

Voice and musical style

Aaliyah had the vocal range of a soprano, and with the release of her debut album Age Ain't Nothing but a Number, writer Dimitri Ehrlich of Entertainment Weekly compared her style and sound to R&B group En Vogue. Ehrlich also expressed that Aaliyah's "silky vocals are more agile than those of self-proclaimed queen of hip-hop soul Mary J. Blige." In her review for Aaliyah's second studio album One in a Million Vibe magazine, music critic Dream Hampton said that Aaliyah's "deliciously feline" voice has the same "pop appeal" as Janet Jackson's. According to Rolling Stone "the most remarkable thing about Aaliyah’s voice, besides its flexibility and crisp range, was its almost preternatural poise — she always seemed to be holding her power in reserve, to know every side of the scenarios she described". In 2001, Aaliyah called her sound "street but sweet", pairing feminine vocals with a gritty urban rhythm track. In another interview she spoke about her artistry, saying, "I love to fuse other types of music with my own". She explored a wide range of genres such as R&B, pop, hip hop, funk, soul, and dance-pop.

Discussing her lyrical content in The New Rolling Stone Album Guide (2004), Keith Harris said "When it came to sexual availability, she was between En Vogue maliciously taunting 'You're never gonna get it' and Tweet blankly cooing 'Oops, there goes my shirt.'" Aaliyah did not usually write her own lyrics. The only time she had a hand in writing is on the song  "Death of a Playa" from the "Hot Like Fire" single (1997). She co-wrote that song with her brother Rashad Haughton, and "it reflects Aaliyah's dark perspective on romance". Of her role in crafting her music, Aaliyah said, "I like to have the final say but I was trained as a singer, actress and dancer, the interpreter, bringing other people's words to life. I need the songs to reflect me in one way or another". After her R. Kelly–produced debut album, Aaliyah worked with Timbaland and Missy Elliott, whose productions were more electronic. The duo "mixed choppy, nervous rhythms over loops of computer-generated backing tracks, and incorporating harmonies which – within the genre's limited horizons – seemed daring".

Aaliyah's songs have been said to have "crisp production" and "staccato arrangements" that "extend genre boundaries" while containing "old-school" soul music. Kelefah Sanneh of The New York Times called her "a digital diva who wove a spell with ones and zeroes", and writes that her songs comprised "simple vocal riffs, repeated and refracted to echo the manipulated loops that create digital rhythm", as Timbaland's "computer-programmed beats fitted perfectly with her cool, breathy voice to create a new kind of electronic music." She released "musically risky singles into a notoriously fickle pop market", without being "concerned about conforming to the stereotypes of the marketplace". Her songs "gracefully walk a line between commerciality and experimentation". Reviewing her album, British publication NME felt that Aaliyah's "radical" third album was "intended to consolidate her position as U.S. R&B's most experimental artist".

As her albums progressed, writers felt that Aaliyah matured, calling her progress a "near-flawless declaration of strength and independence". ABC News noted that her music was "evolving from the punchy pop-influenced hip hop and R&B to a more mature, introspective sound", on her third album. Stephen Thomas Erlewine of AllMusic described her album Aaliyah as "a statement of maturity and a stunning artistic leap forward", and called it one of the strongest urban soul records of its time. She portrayed "unfamiliar sounds, styles and emotions", but managed to please critics with the contemporary sound it contained. Ernest Hardy of Rolling Stone felt that Aaliyah was displaying stronger technique, giving her best vocal performances. Altogether, Aaliyah's music can be described as alternative R&B, progressive soul, and neo soul, according to Time Farley.

Influences
As an artist, Aaliyah said she was inspired by a number of performers. These include Michael Jackson, Stevie Wonder, Sade, Trent Reznor of Nine Inch Nails, Korn, Donnie Hathaway, Johnny Mathis, Janet Jackson, Whitney Houston, and Barbra Streisand. Aaliyah said that Michael Jackson's Thriller was her "favorite album" and that "nothing will ever top Thriller." She said she had always wanted to work with Janet Jackson, to whom she had often been compared, saying, "I admire her a great deal. She's a total performer ... I'd love to do a duet with Janet Jackson." Jackson reciprocated Aaliyah's affection, saying, "I've loved her from the beginning because she always comes out and does something different, musically." Jackson also said she would have enjoyed collaborating with Aaliyah.

Music videos
According to director Paul Hunter from day one, "Aaliyah wanted her videos to stand out from clips by other R&B singers". He stated, "You can watch programming all day and see a certain type of video by female artists, "Then when one of hers comes on it's something special, something different to look at. That's what she was about." Christopher John Farley from Time stated that Aaliyah's "videos, for the most part, are about mood, not about storylines... Her videos are usually lushly shot and infused with sexual tension, though not in overt and obvious ways".

Image
Aaliyah focused on her public image while protecting her private life. USA Today said, "Her slinky vocal style and eye-popping videos made her a crossover star, while her persistent protection of her privacy added an air of intrigue about her". She often wore baggy clothes and sunglasses, stating that she wanted to be herself. Aaliyah also wore black clothing, starting a trend for similar fashion among women in United States and Japan. She felt that it was "important ... to differentiate yourself from the rest of the pack".

When she changed her hairstyle, Aaliyah took her mother's advice and covered her left eye, much like Veronica Lake. The look has become known as her signature and been referred to as fusion of "unnerving emotional honesty" and "a sense of mystique". In 1998, she hired a personal trainer to keep in shape, and exercised five days a week and ate diet foods. Aaliyah was praised for her "clean-cut image" and "moral values". Robert Christgau of The Village Voice wrote of Aaliyah's artistry and image, "she was lithe and dulcet in a way that signified neither jailbait nor hottie—an ingenue whose selling point was sincerity, not innocence and the obverse it implies."

Personal life

Family
Aaliyah's family played a major role in the course of her career. Beginning in 1995, Aaliyah's father Michael Haughton served as her personal manager, and her mother assisted him. Aaliyah's brother Rashad Haughton and her cousin Jomo Hankerson were with her when she worked. After her father became ill, her brother Rashad became her manager.

Aaliyah was known to have usually been accompanied by members of her family. Her brother Rashad stated that the filming of "Rock the Boat" was the only time her family was not present during a video shoot. In October 2001, Rashad said: "It really boggles everyone [that] from Day One, every single video she ever shot there's always been myself or my mother or my father there. The circumstances surrounding this last video were really strange because my mother had eye surgery and couldn't fly. That really bothered her because she always traveled. My dad had to take care of my mom at that time. And I went to Australia to visit some friends. We really couldn't understand why we weren't there. You ask yourself maybe we could have stopped it. But you can't really answer the question. There's always gonna be that question of why." Her friend Kidada Jones said in the last year of Aaliyah's life, her parents had given her more freedom and she had spoken about wanting a family.

Illegal marriage
With the release of Age Ain't Nothing but a Number, rumors circulated about a relationship between Aaliyah and R. Kelly, including the allegation that they had secretly married without her parents' knowledge. Vibe magazine later revealed a marriage certificate that listed the couple married on August 31, 1994, in Sheraton Gateway Suites in Rosemont, Illinois. Aaliyah, who was 15 at the time, was listed as 18 on the certificate; R. Kelly was 27. The marriage was annulled by her parents in February 1995, but the pair denied the allegations, saying that neither was married and that the certificate was a forgery.

Aaliyah reportedly developed an intimate relationship with Kelly during the recording of her debut album. She told Vibe magazine in 1994 that she and Kelly would "go watch a movie" and "go eat" when she got tired and would then "come back and work". She described the relationship between her and Kelly as "rather close." In December 1994, Aaliyah told the Chicago Sun-Times that whenever she was asked about being married to Kelly, she urged them not to believe "all that mess" and that she and Kelly were "close" and "people took it the wrong way".

Jamie Foster Brown in the 1994 issue of Sister 2 Sister wrote that "R. Kelly told me that he and Aaliyah got together, and it was just magic." Brown also reported hearing about a sexual relationship between them. "I've been hearing about Robert and Aaliyah for a while—that she was pregnant. Or that she was coming and going in and out of his house. People would see her walking his dog, 12 Play, with her basketball cap and sunglasses on. Every time I asked the label, they said it was platonic. But I kept hearing complaints from people about her being in the studio with all those men." Brown later added "at 15, you have all those hormones and no brains attached to them".

In his 2011 book The Man Behind the Man: Looking from the Inside Out, Demetrius Smith Sr., Kelly's former tour manager, revealed that Kelly married Aaliyah after she told him that she was pregnant. In the 2019 documentary Surviving R. Kelly, Smith described how he helped Aaliyah forge the necessary documents to show she was 18 in order to marry Kelly. Smith also said he was "not proud" of his role in facilitating their marriage. Additionally, the documentary revealed that Jovante Cunningham, a former backup dancer, claimed to have witnessed Kelly having sex with Aaliyah on his tour bus.

Aaliyah admitted in court documents that she had lied about her age. In May 1997, she filed suit in Cook County seeking to have all records of the marriage expunged because she was not old enough under state law to get married without her parents' consent. It was reported that she cut off all professional and personal ties with Kelly after the marriage was annulled and ceased contact with him. In a 2014 interview, Aaliyah's cousin Jomo Hankerson said that she "got villainized" for her relationship with Kelly and the scandal over the marriage made it difficult to find producers for her second album. "We were coming off of a multi-platinum debut album and except for a couple of relationships with Jermaine Dupri and Puffy, it was hard for us to get producers on the album." Hankerson also expressed confusion over why "they were upset" with Aaliyah given her age at the time.

Aaliyah was known to avoid answering questions about Kelly after the professional split. During an interview with Christopher John Farley, she was asked whether she was still in contact with him and would ever work with him again. Farley said Aaliyah responded with a "firm, frosty 'no'" to both questions. Vibe magazine said Aaliyah changed the subject anytime "you bring up the marriage with her". A spokeswoman for Aaliyah said in 2000 that when "R. Kelly comes up, she doesn't even speak his name, and nobody's allowed to ask about it at all." Kelly later said that Aaliyah had opportunities to address their relationship after they separated professionally but chose not to. In 2019, Damon Dash revealed to Hip Hop Motivation that Aaliyah did not even speak of her relationship with Kelly in private; he tried multiple times to discuss it with her, but she would only say that Kelly was a "bad man". Dash said he was unable to watch Surviving R. Kelly because its interviews with visibly traumatized girls struggling to discuss their encounters with Kelly reminded him of how Aaliyah behaved when trying to recount her relationship with Kelly. Dash later appeared in Surviving R. Kelly, Part 2 in 2020.

Other allegations were made about Kelly regarding underage girls in the years after Aaliyah's death, and their marriage was used as an example of his involvement with them. He has refused to discuss his relationship with her, citing her death. "Out of respect for her, and her mom and her dad, I will not discuss Aaliyah. That was a whole other situation, a whole other time, it was a whole other thing, and I'm sure that people also know that." In 2016, Kelly said that he was as in love with Aaliyah as he was with "anybody else." Aaliyah's mother, Diane Haughton, reflected that everything "that went wrong in her life" began with her relationship with Kelly.

After the documentary Surviving R. Kelly aired in January 2019, pressure from the public using the Mute R. Kelly hashtag escalated and RCA Records dropped Kelly from the label. In February 2019, Kelly was indicted on ten counts of aggravated criminal sexual abuse. In July 2019, he was arrested on federal charges of sex crimes, human trafficking, child pornography, racketeering, and obstruction of justice. When his trial began in August 2021, Kelly faced 22 federal criminal charges that involved allegedly abusing 11 girls and women between 1994 and 2018. Aaliyah's illegal marriage to Kelly was heavily featured in the court case. On September 27, 2021, a federal court jury found Kelly guilty of nine counts including racketeering, sexual exploitation of a child, kidnapping, bribery, sex trafficking, and a violation of the Mann Act. The judge ordered that Kelly remain in custody pending sentencing, which was set for May 4, 2022. On June 29, 2022, Kelly was sentenced to 30 years in jail.

Relationship with Damon Dash
Aaliyah was dating the co-founder of Roc-A-Fella Records, Damon Dash, at the time of her death. Although they were not formally engaged, Dash claimed the couple had planned to marry in interviews given after Aaliyah's death. In the summer of 2000, Aaliyah was introduced to Dash by his accountant and they formed a friendship. Aaliyah never publicly addressed their relationship as anything but platonic. Due to their hectic work schedules, Aaliyah and Dash were separated for long periods of time. Jay-Z mentioned Aaliyah and Dash in the remix of her song "Miss You", released in 2003. In August 2021, Dash told Entertainment Tonight Kevin Frazier, "I was reflecting [that] there hasn't been one day since she's passed, not one in the 20 years, that I haven't either heard her name, heard her record, or seen a picture of her ... Every single day she's present in my life and I feel lucky for that."

Death

On August 25, 2001, at 6:50 p.m. (EDT), Aaliyah and some employees of her record company boarded a twin-engine Cessna 402 light aircraft at the Marsh Harbour Airport in Abaco Islands, the Bahamas, to travel to Opa-Locka Airport in Florida after they completed filming the video for "Rock the Boat". They had a flight scheduled the next day, but with filming finishing early, Aaliyah and her entourage were eager to return to the US and decided to leave immediately. The designated airplane was smaller than the Cessna 404 on which they had originally arrived, but the whole party and all the equipment were accommodated on board.

Aaliyah and the eight others on board—pilot Luis Morales III, hair stylist Eric Forman, Anthony Dodd, security guard Scott Gallin, family friend Keith Wallace, make-up stylist Christopher Maldonado, and Blackground Records employees Douglas Kratz and Gina Smith—were killed.

The passengers had grown impatient because the Cessna was supposed to arrive at 4:30 p.m. EDT, but did not arrive until 6:15 p.m. Charter pilot Lewis Key claimed to have overheard passengers arguing with the pilot, Morales, before takeoff, adding that Morales warned them that there was too much weight for a "safe flight". Key added: "He tried to convince them the plane was overloaded, but they insisted they had chartered the plane and they had to be in Miami Saturday night." Key indicated that Morales gave in to the passengers and that he had trouble starting one of the engines.

According to findings from an inquest conducted by the coroner's office in the Bahamas, Aaliyah had "severe burns and a blow to the head" in addition to severe shock and a weak heart. The coroner theorized that she went into such a state of shock that even if she had survived the crash, her recovery would have been nearly impossible given the severity of her injuries. The bodies were taken to the morgue at Princess Margaret Hospital in Nassau, where they were kept for relatives to help identify them. Some of them were badly burned.

As the subsequent investigation determined, the aircraft was overloaded by  when it attempted to take off, and was carrying one more passenger than it was certified for. The National Transportation Safety Board reported, "The airplane was seen lifting off the runway, and then nose down, impacting in a marsh on the south side of the departure end of runway 27." The report indicated that the pilot was not approved to fly the plane. Morales falsely obtained his FAA license by showing hundreds of hours never flown, and he may also have falsified how many hours he had flown in order to get a job with his employer, Blackhawk International Airways. Additionally, toxicology tests performed on Morales revealed traces of cocaine and alcohol in his system.

Funeral

Aaliyah's private funeral Mass was held on August 31, 2001, at the Church of St. Ignatius Loyola in Manhattan, following a procession from the Frank E. Campbell Funeral Chapel. Her body was set in a silver-plated copper-deposit casket, which was carried in a horse-drawn, glass hearse. An estimated 800 mourners attended the procession.

Among those in attendance at the private ceremony were Missy Elliott, Timbaland, Gladys Knight, Lil' Kim, and Sean Combs. After the service, 22 white doves were released to symbolize each year of her life.

Aaliyah's brother Rashad delivered the eulogy and described his sister as giving him strength: "Aaliyah, you left, but I'll see you always next to me and I can see you smiling through the sunshine. When our life is over, our book is done. I hope God keeps me strong until I see her again." He read the names of the other victims of the crash and concluded by asking mourners to pray for them as well. As Diane Haughton and the mourners left, they sang Aaliyah's song "One in a Million".

Posthumous releases

2001–2011: Aaliyah Memorial Fund, Queen of the Damned and compilations
Immediately after Aaliyah's death, there was uncertainty over whether the music video for "Rock the Boat" would ever air. It made its world premiere on BET's Access Granted on October 9, 2001. She won two posthumous awards at the American Music Awards of 2002; Favorite Female R&B Artist and Favorite R&B/Soul Album for Aaliyah. Her second and final film, Queen of the Damned, was released in February 2002. Before its release, Aaliyah's brother, Rashad, re-dubbed some of her lines during post-production. It grossed US$15.2 million in its first weekend, ranking number one at the box office. On the first anniversary of Aaliyah's death, a candlelight vigil was held in Times Square; millions of fans observed a moment of silence; and throughout the United States, radio stations played her music in remembrance. In December 2002, a collection of previously unreleased material was released as Aaliyah's first posthumous album, I Care 4 U. A portion of the proceeds was donated to the Aaliyah Memorial Fund, a program that benefits the Revlon UCLA Women's Cancer Research Program and Harlem's Sloan Kettering Cancer Center. It debuted at number three on the US Billboard 200, selling 280,000 copies in its first week. The album's lead single, "Miss You", peaked at number three on the Billboard Hot 100 and topped the Hot R&B/Hip-Hop Songs chart for three weeks. In August of the following year, luxury fashion house Dior donated profits from sales in honor of Aaliyah.

In April 2005, Aaliyah's second posthumous album, a double CD+DVD box set titled Ultimate Aaliyah, was released in the United Kingdom by Blackground Records. Andy Kellman of AllMusic remarked "Ultimate Aaliyah adequately represents the shortened career of a tremendous talent who benefited from some of the best songwriting and production work by Timbaland, Missy Elliott, and R. Kelly." A documentary movie Aaliyah Live in Amsterdam was released in 2011, shortly before the tenth anniversary of Aaliyah's death. The documentary, by Pogus Caesar, contained previously unseen footage shot of her career beginnings in 1995 when she was appearing in the Netherlands.

2012–2014: Proposed posthumous album
In March 2012, music producer Jeffrey "J-Dub" Walker announced on his Twitter account that a song "Steady Ground", which he produced for Aaliyah's third album, would be included in the forthcoming posthumous Aaliyah album. This second proposed posthumous album would feature this song using demo vocals, as Walker claims the originals were somehow lost by his sound engineer. Aaliyah's brother Rashad later denied Walker's claim, claiming that "no official album [is] being released and supported by the Haughton family." On August 5, 2012, Blackground Records released the track "Enough Said" online. It was produced by Noah "40" Shebib and features Canadian rapper Drake. Four days later, Jomo Hankerson confirmed a posthumous album is being produced and that it was scheduled to be released by the end of 2012 by Blackground Records. The album was reported to include 16 unreleased songs and have contributions from Aaliyah's longtime collaborators Timbaland and Missy Elliott, among others. On August 13, Timbaland and Missy Elliott dismissed rumors about being contacted or participating for the project. Elliott's manager Mona Scott-Young said in a statement to XXL, "Although Missy and Timbaland always strive to keep the memory of their close friend alive, we have not been contacted about the project nor are there any plans at this time to participate. We've seen the reports surfacing that they have been confirmed to participate but that is not the case. Both Missy and Timbaland are very sensitive to the loss still being felt by the family so we wanted to clear up any misinformation being circulated." Elliott herself said, "Tim and I carry Aaliyah with us everyday, like so many of the people who love her. She will always live in our hearts. We have nothing but love and respect for her memory and for her loved ones left behind still grieving her loss. They are always in our prayers."

In June 2013, Aaliyah was featured on a new track by Chris Brown, titled "Don't Think They Know"; with Aaliyah singing the song's hook. The video features dancing holographic versions of Aaliyah. The song appears on Brown's sixth studio album, X. Timbaland voiced his disapproval for "Enough Said" and "Don't Think They Know" in July 2013. He exclaimed, "Aaliyah music only work with its soulmate, which is me". Soon after, Timbaland apologized to Chris Brown over his remarks, which he explained were made due to Aaliyah and her death being a "very sensitive subject". In January 2014, producer Noah "40" Shebib confirmed that the posthumous album was shelved due to the negative reception surrounding Drake's involvement. Aaliyah was featured on the Tink track "Million", which was released in May 2015 and contained samples from her song "One in a Million".

2015–present: Merchandise, catalogue rerelease and Unstoppable
In September 2015, Aaliyah by Xyrena, an official tribute fragrance, was announced. In November 2015, Timbaland teased that he was working on a new mixtape; a month later on December 16, he revealed the mixtape title, cover, and track listing which included Aaliyah. The 'Kings Stay Kings' mixtape was released on Christmas 2015 and it included an unreleased Aaliyah song titled "Shakin" featuring rapper Strado. In August 2017 MAC Cosmetics announced that an Aaliyah collection would be made available in the summer of 2018. The Aaliyah for Mac collection was released on June 20 online and June 21 in stores; along with the MAC collection, MAC and i-D Magazine partnered up to release a short film titled "A-Z of Aaliyah" which coincided with the launch. The Aaliyah for Mac collectors box was priced at $250 and sold out within minutes.

On August 21, 2019, the Madame Tussauds museum revealed a wax figure of Aaliyah at their Las Vegas location. The lifesize figure was modelled on Aaliyah's iconic "Try Again" outfit and makeup. It was unveiled by her brother, Rashad, to an invited audience. Four days later, Aaliyah's family announced that they were in talks with record companies to discuss the future of her discography, with a view of making it available for download and streaming.

In January 2021, it was announced that Aaliyah would have her own Funko Pop!figurine. The collectible was styled in Aaliyah's 1994 era and was released March 2021 worldwide. In August 2021, it was reported that the album and Aaliyah's other recorded work for Blackground (since rebranded as Blackground Records 2.0) would be re-released on physical, digital, and streaming services in a deal between the label and Empire Distribution. One in a Million was reissued on August 20, despite Aaliyah's estate issuing a statement in response to Blackground 2.0's announcement, denouncing the "unscrupulous endeavor to release Aaliyah's music without any transparency or full accounting to the estate". After the album's re-release, One in a Million re-entered the UK Official Hip Hop and R&B Albums Chart Top 40 at number eight. In the US, the album reached the top ten for on the Billboard 200 for the first time at number ten, selling 26,000 album-equivalent units in the week ending of August 26.

On August 25, 2021, Barry Hankerson revealed in an interview with Big Tigger for WVEE that a fourth (and likely final) studio album, titled Unstoppable, would be released in "a matter of weeks". The album will feature Drake, Snoop Dogg, Ne-Yo, Chris Brown, Future and use previously unreleased vocals from before Aaliyah's passing. Hankerson shared that this will be the end of new music for the late star and added, "I think it's wonderful. It's a very emotional process to do. It's very difficult to hear her sing when she's not here, but we got through it." Aaliyah was reissued September 10, 2021. After the album's re-release, Aaliyah re-entered the UK Official Hip Hop and R&B Albums Chart Top 40 at number seven and reentered the US Billboard 200 chart at number 13, charting at number four for high pure sales. In celebration of the reissue, Blackground released an animated commercial titled "It's Been A Long Time" (in a similar style to the album's original 2001 commercial), directed by Takahiro Tanaka, showing Aaliyah resurrecting her music from out of a large underground vault. Compilation albums I Care 4 U and Ultimate Aaliyah were reissued October 8, 2021. While the I Care 4 U album failed to rechart, Ultimate Aaliyah peaked at number 8 on the UK R&B Albums Chart Top 40 and charted for the first time in the US at number 41 on the Billboard 200.

On December 14, 2021, it was announced that a new single would be released by Aaliyah, featuring The Weeknd. The mid-tempo track, "Poison", was released on December 17, 2021. The single was written by Static Major, The Weeknd and Belly and produced by DannyBoyStyles and Nick Lamb. On January 4, 2022, Hankerson confirmed that Unstoppable would be released later that month, however, there was no sign of the album, nor any announcement from the label and as of 2023 remains unreleased.

Legacy and influence
Aaliyah has been credited for helping redefine R&B, pop and hip hop in the 1990s, "leaving an indelible imprint on the music industry as a whole." According to Billboard, she revolutionized R&B with her sultry mix of pop, soul and hip hop. Peter Piatkowski from PopMatters, stated, "Much like Janet Jackson’s Control set a template of sorts for dance-pop divas in the 1980s, Aaliyah’s patented brand of Black pop, which was a mélange of hip-hop, electropop, and soul, set a standard against which other young urban-pop singers were judged". In a 2001 review of her third album, Ernest Hardy from Rolling Stone professed that Aaliyah's impact on R&B and pop has been enormous. Steve Huey of AllMusic wrote Aaliyah ranks among the "elite" artists of the R&B genre, as she "played a major role in popularizing the stuttering, futuristic production style that consumed hip-hop and urban soul in the late 1990s." Critic Bruce Britt stated that by combining "schoolgirl charm with urban grit, Aaliyah helped define the teen-oriented sound that has resulted in contemporary pop phenom's like Brandy, Christina Aguilera and Destiny's Child".

Described as one of "R&B's most important artists" during the 1990s, her second studio album, One in a Million, became one of the most influential R&B albums of the decade. Music critic Simon Reynolds cited "Are You That Somebody?" as "the most radical pop single" of 1998.  Kelefah Sanneh of The New York Times wrote that rather than being the song's focal point, Aaliyah "knew how to disappear into the music, how to match her voice to the bass line", and consequently "helped change the way popular music sounds; the twitchy, beat-driven songs of Destiny's Child owe a clear debt to 'Are You That Somebody'." Sanneh asserted that by the time of her death in 2001, Aaliyah "had recorded some of the most innovative and influential pop songs of the last five years." Music publication Popdust called Aaliyah an unlikely queen of the underground for her influence on the underground alternative music scene. The publication also mentioned that the forward-thinking music Aaliyah made with Timbaland and the experimental music being made by many underground alternative artists are "somewhat cut from the same cloth". While compiling a list of artists that take cues from Aaliyah, MTV Hive stated that it's easy to spot her influence on underground movements like dubstep, strains of indie pop, and lo-fi R&B movements. Erika Ramirez, an associate editor of Billboard, said at the time of Aaliyah's career "there weren't many artists using the kind of soft vocals the ways she was using it, and now you see a lot of artists doing that and finding success". Ramirez argued that Aaliyah's second album One in a Million was "very much ahead of its time, with the bass and electro kind of R&B sounds that they produced", and that the sound, "really stood out" at its time, was being replicated.

There has been continuing belief that Aaliyah would have achieved greater career success had it not been for her death. Emil Wilbekin mentioned the deaths of The Notorious B.I.G. and Tupac Shakur in conjunction with hers and added: "Her just-released third album and scheduled role in a sequel to The Matrix could have made her another Janet Jackson or Whitney Houston". Director of Queen of the Damned Michael Rymer said of Aaliyah, "God, that girl could have gone so far" and spoke of her having "such a clarity about what she wanted. Nothing was gonna step in her way. No ego, no nervousness, no manipulation. There was nothing to stop her." On July 18, 2014, it was announced that Alexandra Shipp replaced Zendaya for the role of Aaliyah for the Lifetime TV biopic movie Aaliyah: The Princess of R&B, which premiered on November 15, 2014. Zendaya drew criticism because people felt that she was too light skinned and did not greatly resemble Aaliyah. She voiced her strong respect for Aaliyah before dropping out of the project. She explained her choice to withdraw from the film in videos on Instagram. Aaliyah's family has been vocal in their disapproving of the film. Her cousin Jomo Hankerson stated the family would prefer a "major studio release along the lines" of What's Love Got to Do with It, the biopic based on the life of Tina Turner. Aaliyah's family has consulted a lawyer to stop Lifetime from using "any of the music, or any of the photographs and videos" they own and Jomo Hankerson claimed the TV network "didn't reach out." On August 9, 2014, it was announced that Chattrisse Dolabaille and Izaak Smith had been cast as Aaliyah's collaborators Missy Elliott and Timbaland. Dolabaille and Smith both received criticism for their appearances in comparison with that of Missy Elliot and Timbaland. Despite negative reviews, the film's premiere drew 3.2 million viewers, becoming the second highest rated television movie of 2014. On August 17, 2021, Atria Books (an imprint of Simon & Schuster) published Kathy Iandoli's Baby Girl: Better Known as Aaliyah, a biography that draws on interviews with Aaliyah's friends, mentors and family, and document how her career influenced a new generation of artists. It has not been authorized by the Haughton family. On August 5, 2022, Beyoncé released "The Queens Remix" to her single "Break My Soul", in which she name-drops Aaliyah, along with other cultural icons.

Achievements

Aaliyah has sold 8.1 million albums in the United States and an estimated 24 to 32 million albums worldwide. Throughout the years, she has earned several honorific nicknames, including "Princess of R&B", "Queen of Urban Pop", and "Pop Princess", as she "proved she was a muse in her own right". While Ernest Hardy of Rolling Stone dubbed her the "undisputed queen of the midtempo come-on". She also has been referred to as a pop and R&B icon for her impact on those genres.

At the 2001 MTV Video Music Awards, Aaliyah was honored by Janet Jackson, Missy Elliott, Timbaland, Ginuwine and her brother, Rashad, who all paid tribute to her. Also during 2001, the United States Social Security Administration ranked the name Aaliyah as one of the 100 most popular names for newborn girls. In 2003 Aaliyah was ranked as one of "The Top 40 Women of the Video Era" in VH1's The Greatest series. Also, in 2003 in memory of Aaliyah, the Entertainment Industry Foundation created the Aaliyah Memorial Fund to donate money raised to charities she supported. In 2008, she was ranked at number 18 on BET's "Top 25 Dancers of All Time". In December 2009, Billboard magazine ranked Aaliyah at number 70 on its Top Artists of the Decade, while her album Aaliyah was ranked at number 181 on the magazine's Top 200 Albums of the Decade. In 2010 Billboard listed her as the tenth most successful female R&B artist of the past 25 years, and 27th most successful R&B artist overall. In 2011, Essence ranked her at number 14 on its 50 Most Influential R&B Starts list. In 2012, VH1 ranked her number 48 on their "Greatest Women in Music". In 2014, NME ranked her at number 18 on NME 100 most influential artist list. In August 2018, Billboard ranked Aaliyah at number 47 on their Top 60 Female Artists of All-Time list. In 2020, the publication included her on its list of the 100 Greatest Music Video Artists of All Time. Rolling Stone ranked her at number 40 on their 200 Best Singers of All Time list.

Discography

Studio albums
 Age Ain't Nothing but a Number (1994)
 One in a Million (1996)
 Aaliyah (2001)
 Unstoppable (TBA)

Compilation albums
 I Care 4 U (2002)
 Ultimate Aaliyah (2005)

Filmography

See also
 List of artists who reached number one in the United States
 List of awards and nominations received by Aaliyah
 List of fatalities from aviation accidents

References

Bibliography

External links

 
 
 
 Aaliyah on Grammy Awards
 

 
1979 births
2001 deaths
20th-century American actresses
20th-century African-American women singers
21st-century American actresses
21st-century African-American women singers
Actresses from Detroit
African-American actresses
African-American Catholics
African-American dancers
African-American female dancers
African-American models
American child singers
American contemporary R&B singers
American female dancers
American women pop singers
American film actresses
American women hip hop singers
American sopranos
Atlantic Records artists
Burials at Ferncliff Cemetery
Child marriage in the United States
Child pop musicians
Dancers from Michigan
Dance-pop musicians
American women hip hop musicians
Jive Records artists
Midwest hip hop musicians
Musicians from Detroit
Musicians killed in aviation accidents or incidents
Swing Mob artists
Universal Records artists
Victims of aviation accidents or incidents in 2001
Victims of aviation accidents or incidents in the Bahamas
Virgin Records artists